Tonga competed at the 1992 Summer Olympics in Barcelona, Spain.

Competitors
The following is the list of number of competitors in the Games.

Athletics

Men
Track & road events

Combined events

Weightlifting

Men

References

Official Olympic Reports

Nations at the 1992 Summer Olympics
1992
1992 in Tongan sport

ru:Соломоновы Острова на летних Олимпийских играх 1992